Governor Jennings may refer to:

Jonathan Jennings (1784–1834), 1st Governor of Indiana
Samuel Jennings (died 1708), 1st Deputy Governor of West New Jersey from 1682 to 1685, popularly elected as Governor but usurped from that office
William Sherman Jennings (1863–1920), 18th Governor of Florida

See also
Edmund Jenings, Colonial Governor of Virginia from 1706 to 1708